Minimum-gauge railways have a gauge of most commonly , , , , ,  or . The notion of minimum-gauge railways was originally developed by estate railways and the French company of Decauville for light railways, trench railways, mining, and farming applications.

History
The term was originally conceived by Sir Arthur Percival Heywood, who used it in 1874 to describe the principle behind his Duffield Bank Railway, specifically its  gauge, distinguishing it from a "narrow gauge" railway. The original text of Heywood's article defining minimum gauge railways is available online.

In general, minimum-gauge railways maximize their loading gauge, where the dimension of the equipment is made as large as possible with respect to the track gauge while still providing enough stability to keep it from tipping over. Standard gauge railways have vehicles that are approximately twice, and in some cases nearly three times, the track gauge in width, but with minimum gauge railways this can be as much as four times the width of the track as in some of the Sugar Cane Railways of Australia. Minimum-gauge railways allowed for ease of mobility on battlefields, mines, and other restricted environments.

A number of  gauge railways were built in Britain to serve ammunition depots and other military facilities, particularly during the First World War.

In South Australia the Semaphore to Fort Glanville Conservation Park includes a steam engine service that runs on an  track.

During World War II, it was proposed to expedite the Yunnan–Burma Railway using  gauge, since such a small gauge can have the tightest of curves in difficult terrain.

Distinction between ridable miniature and minimum-gauge railway

The major distinction between a miniature railway (US: 'riding railroad' or 'grand scale railroad') and a minimum-gauge railway is that miniature lines use models of full-sized prototypes. There are also rideable miniature railways running on extremely narrow tracks as small as  gauge, for example the Rudyard Lake Steam Railway.

Generally minimum-gauge railways have a working function as estate railways, or industrial railways, or providers of public transport links; although most have a distinct function in relation to tourism, and depend upon tourism for the revenue to support their working function.

Railways

Large amusement railways

See also

Children's railway
Decauville
Feldbahn
Heritage railway
Industrial railway
Light railway
List of British heritage and private railways
List of British private narrow-gauge railways
List of track gauges
Narrow gauge railway
Rail transport in Walt Disney Parks and Resorts
Rail transport modelling scales
Ridable miniature railway
Trench railway
Museum visitor attractions

References

Bibliography 

 
 
 
 
 

 
Lists of track gauges
 
Track gauges by size
Sir Arthur Heywood